HSwMS Psilander was a torpedo cruiser of the Swedish Navy. She was commissioned on 20 July 1900. From 1927 until 1937 she was used for cadet training, and was sunk after being used as an artillery target on 3 August 1939. She was named after the 17th century admiral Gustaf von Psilander.

Örnen-class cruisers
Ships built in Stockholm
1899 ships